Abbe Jean-Joseph-Léandre Bargès, (born in Auriol, Bouches-du-Rhône, February 27, 1810 - December 31, 1896) was a French orientalist.

In 1834 Barges was officially appointed as a priest and became an Arabic teacher at Marseille in 1837. From 1842 to 1885 Barges was professor of Arabic at the Theological Academy in Paris.

Barges focused on the study of the Qarawiyyin medieval scholars, publishing commentaries in Arabic from Yaft bin Ali, interpreted various psalms (1861) and later reviewed Nasyid al-Anasyid (1884). Barges also published a treatise of Judah ibn Kuraish, on the study of the emergence of Hebrew.

References

French orientalists